Keith Harris Todd (2 March 1941 – 8 January 2022) was a Welsh professional footballer who played in the Football League as a forward. He also played for Clydach United before joining Swansea, and spent seven years at Pembroke Borough after his time with Swansea. Todd died on 8 January 2022, at the age of 80.

References

1941 births
2022 deaths
Welsh footballers
Association football forwards
Wales under-23 international footballers
English Football League players
Swansea City A.F.C. players
Pembroke Borough A.F.C. players
People from Glamorgan